Justin Fontaine may refer to:

 Justin Fontaine (ice hockey) (born 1987), Canadian professional hockey player
 Justin Fontaine (racing driver) (born 1997), American racing driver